Robert Alan Baruch Bush (born January 24, 1948, in Phoenix, Arizona) is the Harry H. Rains Distinguished Professor of Alternative Dispute Resolution (ADR) Law at Hofstra University School of Law, Hempstead, New York. Together with Joseph Folger of Temple University he is the originator, and best known advocate, of the transformative model of mediation. He has authored over two dozen articles and books on mediation and ADR. In 2006 he received the Annual PeaceBuilder Award by the New York State Dispute Resolution Association to honor individuals and organizations that have promoted the field of ADR.

Coming from a secular Jewish environment, in his adult life Bush became an orthodox Chabad Jew. Recently he authored an article on mediation in the Jewish tradition, discovering that many of his earlier research findings were compatible with Jewish principles of mediation (P'shara).

Bush is a graduate of Harvard University (B.A. in 1969) and Stanford Law School (J.D. in 1974). He has practiced mediation in various contexts since starting a community mediation program in San Francisco in 1976, and has developed and conducted many training programs on mediation and ADR, including training for lawyers and judges. He has been at Hofstra Law School since 1980.

Bibliography 

Bush, Baruch: The Dilemmas of Mediation Practice (National Institute for Dispute Resolution, 1992)
Bush, Baruch, and Joseph Folger: The Promise of Mediation (Jossey-Bass, 1994)
Bush, Baruch, and Joseph Folger: The Promise of Mediation (revised Jossey-Bass, 2004) Despite the similar title, almost entirely different from the 1994 first edition
Bush, Robert Baruch. Expectations for International Mediation Interaction: Conference Report. Summer 1996. V. 8, No. 2. pp. 5–18.
Bush, Baruch, and Joseph Folger: Designing Mediation: Approaches to Training and Practice within a Transformative Framework (Institute for the Study of Conflict Transformation, 2001).

References

Living people
Baalei teshuva
American Orthodox Jews
Harvard University alumni
Stanford Law School alumni
1948 births
American legal scholars
Hofstra University faculty